Quiller Consultants is a British lobbying and public relations firm based in Westminster in central London that has close links to the Conservative party.

The company was formed in 1998 by John Eisenhammer, a former journalist with The Independent and Jonathan Hill, a former Whitehall mandarin. Both had previously worked at Bell Pottinger and Hill was later made a life peer by the Conservatives. In 2006, Quiller was acquired by Huntsworth, a company owned by Peter Gummer who ran the Conservative party in David Cameron's constituency.

Employees
Current or former employees include:
Gerard Russell - a former British diplomat in the Middle East who was in charge of Quilter's work on behalf of the United Arab Emirates including briefing journalists to write negative articles on Qatar.
George Bridges - former political director for David Cameron and a Conservative life peer since 2015.
Howell James - former adviser to John Major and the CEO of Quiller from 2014 to 2017.
Sarah Jones - Labour MP for Croydon.
Stephen Parkinson - previously worked for David Cameron and was later appointed as an adviser to Theresa May
Sean Worth - former adviser to David Cameron.

Clients
A4e
British Land
Capita
CDC Group
City of London Corporation - during the Occupy London protests.
The Co-operative Group during the scandal surrounding chairman Paul Flower's drug use.

HSBC

MigrationWatch UK
PricewaterhouseCoopers
Telefonica
Tesco
United Arab Emirates

References

External links 
 Company website
 Quiller Consultants at Powerbase

Companies based in London
Public relations companies of the United Kingdom